Paul Dickey (born 1948 in Hardtner, KS) is an American poet, author, philosophy instructor, and playwright who has published three books of poetry  and a full-length play, The Good News According to St. Dude, that analyzes and dramatizes the disillusion of the 1960s youth counter-culture.

Career
His poetry appears in three textbook anthologies and approximately 150 literary journals, both in print and online.   His ten-minute plays (or flash drama) and comedy skits have been performed onstage at the Shelterbelt Theatre in Omaha, NE, and in theatres in Dover, NJ, and New York City.

Dickey has published fiction (including flash fiction), short plays, creative nonfiction, and poetry in multiple genres, including prose poetry, formal verse—both serious and comic, and free verse.  Of their publications for the year 2011, Mayapple Press selected Dickey's first book They Say This is How Death Came Into the World to be nominated for the National Book Award in Poetry. Dickey won the 2015 Master Poet Award from the Nebraska Arts Council.

Michel Delville, the author of a major critical work on prose poetry, The American Prose Poem: Poetic Form and the Boundaries of Genre (University Press of Florida, 1998), said of Dickey: "Whether it’s a poem about (or around) Mark Rothko’s painting Yellow Band or a prose poem about 'Mowing the Lawn' that pauses with Husserl’s phenomenology, Dickey’s poetry is grounded in a recognition that, to quote Sherwood Anderson, 'each truth [is] a composite of a great many vague thoughts,' all equally beautiful and disturbing, somber and happy."   Prose poet Nin Andrews (author of twelve poetry collections) writes of Dickey's They Say This Is How Death Came into the World that it is "seductively inventive, charmingly clever and seriously witty. The pleasures offered by Paul Dickey’s quirky and irreverent meditations are utterly irresistible."

Dickey has a Master of Art’s degree from Indiana University Bloomington, in the History and Philosophy of Science. In the 1970s, while a graduate student at Wichita State University,
he published poetry in The Kansas Quarterly, Quartet, and Nimrod.  At Wichita State, he was a student of the American-Filipino poet, novelist, and short story author Bienvenido Santos. Dickey currently teaches philosophy in Omaha, Nebraska at Metropolitan Community College (Nebraska).

Bibliography

Books

Wires Over the Homeplace (Pinyon Publishing, 2013) 
Liberal Limericks of 2012 (The Missouri River Review Press, 2012) (e-book). Illustrated by Ira Joel Haber. ASIN: B008MP9POM 
They Say This is How Death Came Into the World (Mayapple Press, 2011)   
What Wisconsin Took (Parallel Press, 2006)

Anthologies
"In a Country Where Everything Has Spin" in Santi, Alexis Enrico (Editor), Best of Our Stories, Volume 3, CreateSpace, 2010. 
"When It All Comes Down to the Last Resort" in Clements, Brian & Jamey Dunham (Editors), An Introduction to the Prose Poem, Firewheel Editions, 2010. 
"Constellation" in Kosmicki, Greg & Mary K Stillwell (Editors), Nebraska Presence: An Anthology of Poetry, (Omaha, NE: The Backwaters Press, 2007.)

Poetry, Fiction, Drama, and Creative Nonfiction

''32 Poems, Anti-, Bellevue Literary Review, Cider Press Review, Concho River Review, Crab Orchard Review, Cue: A Journal of Prose Poetry, diode, failbetter, The Freeman, Chamber Four, Laurel Review, Light (journal), Linebreak, Memoir (and), Mid-American Review, Nimrod, Pleiades (journal), Poet Lore, Potomac Review, Prairie Schooner, Rattle, Sentence, and Southern Poetry Review."

References

External links 
 
 Wichita State University Poetry Reading 10/6/2011
 Rattle editor Tim Green interviews Dickey
 Waldorf College Library Guide
 John H. Ames Reading Series (Lincoln)
 What Wisconsin Took (view online)

1948 births
Living people
Wichita State University alumni
Writers from Wichita, Kansas
Poets from Kansas
Poets from Nebraska
Writers from Omaha, Nebraska
Indiana University Bloomington alumni